The coat of arms of the  German state of Hesse was introduced in 1949. It is based on the historical coat of arms of the Ludovingian landgraves of Hesse and Thuringia.

History

References

See also
Coat of arms of Prussia
Coat of arms of Germany
Coat of arms of Thuringia, which has a similar appearance.
Origin of the coats of arms of German federal states.

Hesse
Hesse
Culture of Hesse
Hesse
Hesse